The Bird and the Bee Sides is a double EP by the American band Relient K. In the United States it was released on July 1, 2008.

The double EP was released on a single disc, containing both The Nashville Tennis EP and The Bird and the Bee Sides.

The Nashville Tennis EP (whose title is a pun on Nashville, Tennessee) includes 13 tracks of new material that allowed the band to explore their sound by channeling country and ska influences, as well as feature compositions by band members other than Thiessen and Hoopes.

The Bird and the Bee Sides is a collection of rarities or unreleased demos from earlier in the band's career.

The collection debuted at No. 25 on the Billboard 200 with approximately 20,000 albums sold.

Track listing

The Nashville Tennis EP

The Bird and the Bee Sides

Personnel
Relient K
Matt Thiessen - lead vocals, rhythm guitar, piano, co-producer
Matt Hoopes - lead guitar, backing vocals
Brian Pittman - bass (pre-2004 tracks)
Dave Douglas - drums, backing vocals (pre-2008 tracks)
John Warne - bass, backing vocals (2005-2008 tracks)
Jon Schneck - rhythm guitar, backing vocals (2005-2008 tracks)
Ethan Luck - drums (2008 tracks)

Additional production
Mark Lee Townsend - producer
Brett Schoneman (formerly of Philmore) - drums (track 16, 20 & 21)
Lane Johnson - drums (on "Where Do I Go (Acoustic)")
Tobin Hyman - A&R coordination
Sara Marienthal - A&R coordination
Mike Condo - production coordination
Davy Baysinger (formerly of Bleach) - artwork

Bonus material
Those who pre-ordered The Bird and the Bee Sides received two "instant song downloads" ("Up and Up" and "The Lining Is Silver"), a Relient K and Gotee Records sticker pack, and a collector's-edition postcard.

Online scavenger hunt
Relient K held an online scavenger hunt for tracks that were cut from The Bird and the Bee Sides. The clues lead to "Hope For Every Fallen Man", "Where Do I Go (Acoustic)", and "Between You and Me". Two more songs are intended to be released some time for the scavenger hunt, and were announced to be the demo of "I'm Lion-O" from the band's 1998 demo album All Work & No Play and the unreleased demo of "Sadie Hawkins Dance".

References

External links
 album announcement and more details on Matt Thiessen's Blog

Relient K albums
Albums produced by Mark Lee Townsend
B-side compilation albums
2008 EPs
2008 compilation albums
Gotee Records compilation albums
Gotee Records EPs